Ronaldo da Costa (born June 7, 1970) is a Brazilian former long-distance runner and world-record holder for the marathon distance. He was born in Descoberto.

Career
Da Costa broke the ten-year-old marathon world record in 1998 in Berlin, having been fifth-placed in the previous year. The record had been held by Belayneh Densamo from Ethiopia at the Rotterdam Marathon in April 1988. The record fell in the following year, almost eleven months later. During his record run Da Costa also was the first man to officially reach the 40 km mark under two hours. He arrived at the 40K split in 1:59:55.

The youngest of eleven children, Da Costa became a national hero after winning the internationally competed São Silvestre Brazilian road race (15 km) in 1994.  The same year he won the 5,000 m in the Ibero-American Championships entered by south-western European, Central and Southern American countries.  From 1997, aged 27, until 2003 Da Costa achieved top-20 results in four marathons, however unlike most marathon record holders, did not win any international marathons apart from his world-record-breaking run.

Achievements

References

External links
 Profile

1970 births
Living people
Brazilian male long-distance runners
Athletes (track and field) at the 1995 Pan American Games
Athletes (track and field) at the 1996 Summer Olympics
Olympic athletes of Brazil
World record setters in athletics (track and field)
Berlin Marathon male winners
Brazilian male marathon runners
Pan American Games medalists in athletics (track and field)
Pan American Games bronze medalists for Brazil
Recipients of the Association of International Marathons and Distance Races Best Marathon Runner Award
Medalists at the 1995 Pan American Games
20th-century Brazilian people
21st-century Brazilian people